Waverton was the name of two former railway stations near the village of Waverton, Cheshire that served the Grand Junction Railway and later the Whitchurch and Tattenhall Railway.

History

First station

The original station opened in October 1840, on the Crewe to Chester line built by the Grand Junction Railway. It was initially called "Black Dog", after the nearby pub, before its name was changed to Waverton two years later. The station had a building and two side platforms.

It was situated next to the bridge that carried the London to Birkenhead coach road (today A41).

Second Station

This station, which opened on the day the first station closed, had two side platforms with matching buildings and canopies. It also had goods sidings. Passengers services ceased in 1959 and the station closed completely six years later.

Today, only part of the eastbound station building remains. The building on the former Chester-bound platform has been demolished.

In 2018 Stagecoach Merseyside & South Lancashire opened a bus depot on the former station site.

Services

Accidents
A collision on the line was reported on 2nd September 1865 when an excursion train ran into a goods train that was shunting wagons. The locomotive was derailed and part of the track 'torn up'. From the description it seems that the shunting of goods trains at the siding at almost all stations of the time was timed to occur during gaps in the regular service. It was said that the greater proportion of accidents happened to excursion trains, and that there was deemed to be a "railway accident season" which coincided with the season for excursions.

On 29th September 1882 there was another accident at or near to Waverton when the midnight Irish Mail Train collided with a Wigan goods train that had overshot its mark at the points and was slightly across the main line. While no one was killed many were injured and were taken to Crewe where they were tended to by the company's surgeon at the Crewe Arms Hotel.

See also
Listed buildings in Waverton, Cheshire

References

Sources

Further reading

External links
 Present-day image of Waverton station

Disused railway stations in Cheshire
Former London and North Western Railway stations
Railway stations in Great Britain opened in 1840
Railway stations in Great Britain closed in 1898
Railway stations in Great Britain opened in 1898
Railway stations in Great Britain closed in 1959